Trenton Joel Tollakson (born August 12, 1980) is a US triathlete, ironman champion (2011, 2014) and North American champion (2014).

Career 
Tollakson ran his first triathlon in July 2001, and he has been a professional triathlete since 2008. In July 2011, he achieved his first long-distance victory at Lake Placid (3.86 km swimming, 180.2 km cycling and 42.195 km running).

In August 2014 he won his second ironman race at the Ironman Mont-Tremblant with a new course record and won the North American Championships.

In November 2016 he was - as in the previous year - third at the Ironman Arizona.

In May 2019 he won the Ironman 70.3 Gulf Coast, his third Ironman 70.3 race.

In June 2021, TJ retired from the pro field. His last professional race was the Ironman 70.3 in his home town of Des Moines, IA where he finished 12th.

Dimond Bikes 

In 2011 TJ founded his own manufacturing company Dimond Bikes in Des Moines, IA. Starting when TJ won his first Ironman at Lake Placid New York on a modified and re-branded Zipp 2001 beam bike manufactured in 1996. This 15 year old bicycle was wind tunnel tested as one of the fastest bicycles at the time and Tollakson used his knowledge of these wind tunnels and connections with current employees at Zipp to procure and modify the Zipp bike for racing. Tollakson tried to convince Zipp to start manufacturing the Zipp 2001, and after Zipp declined interest they instead offered support in helping Tollakson make his own. Tollakson and few Zipp employees redesigned the Zipp 2001 beam bike frame and by May 2012 the first prototypes of the original Dimond Bike were designed. In August 2012 Tollakson raced the one and only Ironman NYC on his new prototype frame. In November 2013 the first mass production of Dimond bikes out of their factory in Des Moines, IA was launched. It was at Ironman Arizona that the Dimond Bike premiered along with the wind tunnel reports confirming its spot at the top of the list of “ world's fastest bikes”. In 2016, Dimond Bikes launched a new model of beam bike called the Dimond Marquise featuring improved aerodynamics and refined integrated storage solutions. In 2018 they released a disc brake version of the Marquise at the Ironman World Championships in Kona, HI. In 2019 the company released yet another beam bike model titled the Dimond Mogul. The Mogul combines superior aerodynamic underbody improvements with the integrated storage of the Marquise.

Personal life
He has been married to Ashley Tousley since January 2011 and they both live in Des Moines, USA with their 3 children.

Sporting successes 

(DNF – Did Not Finish)

References

External links 
 Official website
Dimond Bikes website

1980 births
Living people
American male triathletes